Cheshmeh Ali or Cheshmeh-ye Ali or Chashmeh Ali may refer to:

Cheshmeh-Ali (Shahr-e-Rey)
Cheshmeh Ali, Chaharmahal and Bakhtiari
Cheshmeh Ali, Golestan
Cheshmeh Ali, Hamadan
Cheshmeh-ye Ali, Khuzestan
Cheshmeh Ali, Khuzestan
Cheshmeh Ali, Lorestan
Cheshmeh Ali, Qom
Cheshmeh Ali, Fariman, Razavi Khorasan Province
Cheshmeh-ye Ali, Qalandarabad, Razavi Khorasan Province
Chashmeh Ali, Sistan and Baluchestan

See also
Cheshmeh-ye Ali Akbar